Clover School District, officially known as York County School District 2, is a suburban school district located in York County, in north-central South Carolina, near the North Carolina border.  The district is located in a primarily rural setting in the piedmont region of South Carolina and is home to approximately 24,250 residents. The district is bordered by Cherokee County, SC to the west; York and Rock Hill to the south; and Cleveland County and Gaston County, NC to the north.

Clover School District serves roughly 6,500 students in grades pre-k through 12.  The much-respected reputation of the district has helped influence a strong surge of growth to the area, particularly around Lake Wylie.

Administration
The current superintendent is Dr. Sheila Quinn and the Board of Trustees is made up of seven members: 
Jay Young
Joe Gordon
Sherri Ciurlik
Liz Johnson
Mack McCarter
Ginger Marr
Rob Wallace
Dr. Mark Sosne, the previous superintendent, retired after the 2017–2018 school year.

Schools
The district is made up of seven elementary schools, two middle schools, one high school and an alternative school. Below is a complete list of component schools:

Elementary schools
 Bethany Elementary School
 Bethel Elementary School
 Crowders Creek Elementary School
 Griggs Road Elementary School
 Kinard Elementary School
 Larne Elementary School
 Oakridge Elementary School

Middle schools
Clover Middle School
Oakridge Middle School

High schools
Clover High School

Alternative schools
 Blue Eagle Academy

References

External links

School districts in South Carolina
York County